Maria Cristina Borges de Oliveira (born 29 August 1959) is a Brazilian chess player who holds the FIDE title of Woman International Master (WIM, 1977). She is a two-time Brazilian Women's Chess Champion (1975, 1986).

Biography
From the mid-1970s until the end of the 1980s, Maria Cristina de Oliveira was one of the leading Brazilian chess players. She has participated in many Brazilian Women's Chess Championships where she won two gold medals: 1975 and 1986. In 1976, Maria Cristina de Oliveira participated at Women's World Chess Championship Interzonal Tournament in Rozendaal and ranked 12th place.

Maria Cristina de Oliveira played for Brazil in the Women's Chess Olympiad:
 In 1986, at first board in the 27th Chess Olympiad (women) in Dubai (+4, =4, -4).

In 1977, Maria Cristina de Oliveira awarded the FIDE Woman International Master (WIM) title.

References

External links
 
 
 

1959 births
Living people
Sportspeople from Belo Horizonte
Brazilian female chess players
Chess Woman International Masters
Chess Olympiad competitors